The following is a list of notable people who were either born in, lived in, are current residents of, or are otherwise closely associated with or around the city of Bacolod, in Negros Occidental of the Negros Island, Philippines. Those not born in Bacolod have their places/province/countries of birth listed instead.

Entertainment
Grendel Alvarado – fashion model, winner of Philippines' Next Top Model
Patricia Alvarez – local teen model of the Runcav Philippines (2011-2016)
Erica Arlante-Yamakawa – Pinoy Big Brother: Unlimited (Season 4) housemate
Vickie Rushton – Pinoy Big Brother: All In, 4th Big Placer Housemate 
Analyn Barro –  Filipina actress who became known after joining GMA Network’s reality-based artista search, Starstruck Season 6.
Ella Mae Saison – singer and composer
Migo Adecer –  Filipino/Australian singer/composer, dancer and actor. 
Alvin Elchico – TV/Radio Host, former provincial correspondent
Richard Enriquez – DZMM Anchor and Radio Disc Jockey
Bobby Enriquez – jazz pianist who became prominent in the United States and well-known internationally
Peque Gallaga – multi award-winning film director
Francesca Ignacio – local teen model of the Runcav Philippines (2011-2015)
Allan K. – singer, comedian, actor and TV host
Ronnie Lazaro – award-winning actor
Kuh Ledesma – popular pop and jazz singer; dubbed as the Pop Diva of the Philippines
Enrique G. Magalona, Jr. – award-winning actor
Francis Magalona – actor, TV host, VJ, and rapper
Romy Pastrana – comedian; better known by his screen name "Dagul"
Aurora Pijuan – beauty queen; crowned Miss International 1970
Susan Roces – award-winning actress, nicknamed Queen of Philippine Movies; widow of Fernando Poe, Jr.
Edsel Santiago – kids model of the Runcav Philippines
Sandra Seifert – beauty queen; crowned Miss Earth-Air 2009 and an international fashion model
Rosemarie Sonora – former actress
Eduardo Sicangco – Scene Designer and Illustrator for Broadway, Opera and film
Christian Vasquez – actor, model and former Pinoy Big Brother: Celebrity Edition housemate
Margaret Nales Wilson – beauty pageant contestant, TV personality, and actress
Joel Torre – award-winning actor and director
Angel Locsin – actress, fashion designer, and director

Literature
Elsa Martinez Coscolluela – award-winning poet, short-story writer, and playwright
Nonoy Espina – journalist, activist, freedom fighter, College Editors Guild of the Philippines' Marcelo H. Del. Pilar Awardee, co-founder and former chairperson of the National Union of Journalists in the Philippines (NUJP), Man for the Masses

Science and Medicine 

 Raul Fabella, National Scientist of the Philippines for Economics
 Ramon Gustilo – orthopedic surgeon; devised the Gustilo open fracture classification system

Politics
Rafael Alunan III – former Secretary of the Interior and Secretary of Agriculture
Gen. Victor Ibrado – former Armed Forces of the Philippines Chief of Staff
Enrique B. Magalona – former senator of the Philippines
Alfredo Montelibano, Sr. – politician and industrialist; served as Mayor of Bacolod City, Governor of Negros Occidental, and Philippine Secretary of National Defense and Interior
Leticia dela Peña – politician; formerly a member of Lakas-Kampi-CMD, she was elected to three terms as a member of the House of Representatives of the Philippines, representing the Legislative district of Bacolod City. She was first elected to Congress in 2001, and was re-elected in 2004 and 2007. Also Mayor of Bacolod City from 2013-2015. 
Evelio Leonardia – politician; incumbent Mayor of Bacolod; 1st Mayor to finish three (3) consecutive terms; 
 Neri Colmenares – human rights lawyer and former Bayan Muna party-list representative

Religion
Rolando Ramos Dizon – De La Salle brother, former chairman of the Commission on Higher Education
Antonio Fortich – former Bishop of Bacolod, political activist and Ramon Magsaysay Awardee
Jesus Varela – Bishop Emeritus of the Roman Catholic Diocese of Sorsogon, former President of the Philippine Federation of Catholic Broadcasters

Sports
Nonoy Baclao – professional basketball player; plays for the Alaska Aces in the Philippine Basketball Association
Jeffrei Chan – professional basketball player in the Philippine Basketball Association who currently plays for the Rain or Shine Elasto Painters
Monsour del Rosario – taekwondo champion who has also starred in several Filipino and international action films
Boyet Fernandez – coach of the Philippine Basketball Association's NLEX Road Warriors
Ramil Gallego – professional pool player
Reynel Hugnatan – professional basketball player of the Philippine Basketball Association
Noli Locsin – Philippine Basketball Association Mythical Team awardee
Donnie Nietes – professional boxer, is the longest Filipino reigning world champion and former WBO Minimumweight World, WBO Light flyweight, The Ring light flyweight and IBF Flyweight Champion.
Christopher Remkes – gymnast, competed for Australia and won gold in the men's Vault event at the 2018 Commonwealth Games
Joan Tipon – boxer, Asian Games gold medalist
Ben Villaflor – boxer who was the WBA world junior lightweight (now called super featherweight) champion during the 1970s
Genesis Servania – professional boxer; nicknamed "Azukal" and previously undefeated
LA Revilla – professional basketball player; plays for the Mahindra Enforcer in the Philippine Basketball Association
Ramon Pido – former professional basketball player in MBA, and in Pampanga Dragons, Swift PABL, and Happee toothpaste in PBL; also assistant coach of Kia motors in PBA and head coach of Gen San Warriors of Manny Pacquiao
Jeff Manday – a professional basketball player
 Johann Chua – professional pool player
 Melissa Gohing-Nacino – professional volleyball player

See also
List of people from Negros Occidental
 List of people from Dumaguete

References

People from Bacolod
People from Negros Occidental
Lists of people by city in the Philippines